Brock Alan Peterson (born November 20, 1983) is an American former professional baseball left fielder and first baseman. He played in Major League Baseball (MLB) for the St. Louis Cardinals.

Career

Minnesota Twins
He was drafted by the Minnesota Twins in the 49th round of the 2002 MLB draft out of W. F. West High School in Chehalis, Washington. He played in the Twins farm system from 2003 to 2010. This included his playing with the Elizabethton Twins (Appalachian League), Quad Cities River Bandits (Midwest League), Fort Myers Miracle (Florida State League), New Britain Rock Cats (Eastern League) and Rochester Red Wings (International League)

Bridgeport Bluefish
After his release from the Twins organization after the 2010 season, he signed with the Bridgeport Bluefish of the Atlantic League of Professional Baseball, where he played in 2011 and 2012. In 165 games for the Bluefish, he hit. 285 with 32 homers and 99 RBI.

St. Louis Cardinals
On August 14, 2012, he signed a minor league contract with the St. Louis Cardinals, who assigned him to the AAA Memphis Redbirds. In 2013, with the Redbirds, he hit .296 in 122 games with 25 homers and 86 RBI.

After spending a decade in minor league and independent league baseball, Peterson was called up to the majors for the first time by Cardinals on July 20, 2013. He made his first appearance that same night, in a losing cause against the San Diego Padres, driving in a run in his pinch-hit at-bat with a groundout. His first hit was a pinch-hit RBI single on July 24 against Jake Diekman of the Philadelphia Phillies.

While playing for the Redbirds, Peterson was selected to compete in the 2013 Triple-A All-Star Game and the Triple-A Home Run Derby. He led the first round with 7 home runs and finished in 2nd place. However that success did not follow him after being called up by the Cardinals. Used largely as a pinch hitter, he went 2 for 26 at the plate. On November 5, 2013, Peterson was given his outright release by the Cardinals and elected free agency.

Washington Nationals / Los Angeles Dodgers
He then signed a minor league deal with the Washington Nationals, who sent him to the AAA Syracuse Chiefs. He played in 72 games in Syracuse and hit .250. On July 1, 2014 he was sold to the Los Angeles Dodgers. In 45 games for the Dodgers AAA team, the Albuquerque Isotopes, he hit .387 with 9 homers and 36 RBI.

Minnesota Twins
The Twins signed Peterson to a minor league contract on December 22, 2014. 
He was subsequently released on May 22, 2015.

New York Mets
Signed to Minor League Contract by New York Mets on June 4, 2015  He became a free agent on November 6, 2015.

Personal life
Peterson was paralyzed from the chest down in a diving accident on July 3, 2021 and as of August 2021 is undergoing rehabilitation at the Shepherd Center in Atlanta, Georgia.

References

External links

1983 births
Living people
Major League Baseball first basemen
Major League Baseball outfielders
St. Louis Cardinals players
Elizabethton Twins players
Quad Cities River Bandits players
Fort Myers Miracle players
New Britain Rock Cats players
Rochester Red Wings players
Bridgeport Bluefish players
Memphis Redbirds players
Syracuse Chiefs players
Albuquerque Isotopes players
Binghamton Mets players
People from Centralia, Washington
Baseball players from Washington (state)
Toros del Este players
American expatriate baseball players in the Dominican Republic
Águilas de Mexicali players
American expatriate baseball players in Mexico